Lacera contrasta is a moth of the family Erebidae. It is found on Fiji.

References

Moths described in 1979
Lacera
Moths of Fiji